The Democratic Party Sint Maarten is a political party in Sint Maarten. The party was long associated with its powerful leader, business tycoon Claude Wathey. Wathey stepped down from his leadership post in 1992. The party was dissolved in 2017 and refounded in 2023.

Dissolution and Refoundation
In the aftermath of Hurricane Irma, which hit the island hard on 6 September 2017 and paralyzed the economy, the Democratic Party and the United People's Party decided to merge to form the United Democrats. Five years later, on 10 January 2023, a party congress was announced to take place on 22 January. Party leader Sarah Wescott-Williams cited Sint Maarten's "personal (individual) political system" as a cause for political instability and described the upcoming congress as "more than the usual annual council meeting of the party" and a "regeneration meeting".

References

See also
Democratic Party (Curacao)
Democratic Party (Sint Eustatius)

Political parties in Sint Maarten
Political parties established in 1954
1954 establishments in the Netherlands Antilles

Political parties disestablished in 2017
2017 disestablishments in Sint Maarten